Phanerochaete carnosa is a species of crust fungus in the family Phanerochaetaceae. It is a plant pathogen that infects plane trees. The fungus was first described to science by Edward Angus Burt in 1926 as a species of Peniophora. It was transferred to the genus Phanerochaete by Erast Parmasto in 1967.

References

Fungal tree pathogens and diseases
carnosa
Fungi described in 1967